A Family Affair is a 2001 lesbian romantic comedy directed by Helen Lesnick. The director followed the film up with Inescapable in 2003.

Plot
Rachel Rosen (Helen Lesnick) moves back to California after breaking up with her girlfriend Reggie Abravanel (Michele Greene) who she had been with for the past 13 years. After a string of unsuccessful new relationships Rachel agrees to let her mother Leah Rosen (Arlene Golonka) set her up on a blind date with Christine Peterson (Erica Shaffer). Their relationship is a success and a year later they decide to get married. Then a few days before the wedding Reggie comes to California to find Rachel, hoping to get back together...

Cast
Helen Lesnick as Rachel Rosen
Erica Shaffer as Christine Peterson
Arlene Golonka as Leah Rosen
Barbara Stuart as Sylvia Peterson
Michele Greene as Reggie Abravanel
Suzanne Westenhoefer as Carol Rosen
Michael Moerman as Sam Rosen
David Radford as Joe
Don Loper as Matthew Rosen
Keith E. Wright as Rob
Mark DeWhitt as Danny
Tracy Hughes as Nancy
Joel Hepner as Stanley Peterson
Suzana Norberg as Kathi
Michael McGee as Barry
Jack Silbaugh as Steve
Kelly Neill as Debi
Ellen Lawler as Suzi
Suzi Miller as Teri

External links
 

2001 films
Lesbian-related films
2001 LGBT-related films
2000s English-language films